Viktoriya Fomenko (born 2 October 1970) is a retired Ukrainian sprinter who specialized in the 200 metres.

She competed at the 1994 European Championships, the 1995 World Indoor Championships, and the 1996 Olympic Games without reaching the final. In the 4 x 100 metres relay she finished fourth at the 1994 European Championships. She was also a part of the disqualified Ukrainian team at the 1997 World Championships. In the 4 x 400 metres relay she competed at the 1995 World Championships and the 1996 Olympic Games without reaching the final.

Her personal best times are 11.37 seconds in the 100 metres, achieved in May 1993 in Kyiv; 22.59 seconds in the 200 metres, achieved in June 1996 in Kyiv; and 50.94 seconds in the 400 metres, achieved in May 1996 in Kyiv.

References

1970 births
Living people
Ukrainian female sprinters
Athletes (track and field) at the 1996 Summer Olympics
Olympic athletes of Ukraine
Universiade medalists in athletics (track and field)
Goodwill Games medalists in athletics
Universiade bronze medalists for Ukraine
Medalists at the 1995 Summer Universiade
Competitors at the 1994 Goodwill Games
Olympic female sprinters